Mechanicus Kretz' House (Danish: Mekanicus Kretz' Gård) is located at Store Kongensgade 67 in central Copenhagen, Denmark.  The complex consists of a residential building fronting the street from the 1930s and two older rear wings. They were all listed on the Danish registry of protected buildings and places by the Danish Heritage Agency on 23 May 1973.

History

Earlier buildings
The property was by 1689 as No. 153 in St. Ann's West Quarter owned by skipper Peder Becher. This property has by 1645 been divided into two properties, now known as No. 57 and No. 58, which were both owned by admiral Frederik Hoppe. The psouthern property was in the new cadastre of 1806 again listed as No. 57 and was by then owned by a major named Kierkerup. The northern property was in the cadastre of 1806 again listed as No. 58 and was by then owned by one Charles Axel Nordberg.

Current building
In 1836, No. 68 and No. 58 were merged into a single property as No. 57 & 58. The current building was constructed in 1838 by the namesake mechanicus Peter Johannes Kretz (1780 - 1851). He attended the Building School of the Royal Danish Academy of Fine Arts where he won the small silver medal in 1797 and the large silver medal in 1798. He unsuccessfully competed for the gold medal in 1900 and worked as a joiner from 1801. He married Maria Genoveva Blankensteiner (1788 - 1871) on 18 February 1808 in St. Ansgar's Church and she bore him 11 children. Kretz acquired the site at Store Kongensgade 67 in 1828 and as of that year worked with construction of machines ("Tischlermeister, Mechanikus und Maschinbauer"). He constructed the current building fronting the street in 1836-1838. The family lived in the ground floor (to the right) and he lived there until his death in 1851. The apartments on the other floors were let out. Count W. C. E. von Sponneck (1815-1888)  was a tenant in 1842–844. Pastor Andresen operated a private school from the buildings in the courtyard (No. B og C) ifrom 1871 to 1891.

The building was listed on the Danish registry of protected buildings and places by the Danish Heritage Agency on 23 May 1973.

Architecture
The building fronting the street consists of four storeys and a cellar and is eight bays wide. It represents the transition from Neoclassical to the Late Classical period. The profiled frames around the windows and the arched shop windows are characteristic of the latter period. A gateway opens to the first of two successive courtyards. Two side wings project from the rear side of the building along the north and south side of the first courtyard. A two-storey building with exposed timber framing separates the two courtyards. Another two-storey building runs along the north side of the second courtyard.

Today
The building fronting the street contains apartments )ejerlejligheder). A law firm, Advokaterne Fabritius Tengnagel & Heine, os based in the rear wing at Store Kongensgade 67C.

References

External links

 P. J. Kretz

Listed residential buildings in Copenhagen
Residential buildings completed in 1838
1838 establishments in Denmark